The French ironclad Magnanime was one of 10  armored frigates built for the French Navy (Marine Nationale) during the 1860s. Commissioned in 1865, she was initially assigned to the Northern Squadron (Escadre du Nord), but was soon transferred to the Mediterranean Squadron (Escadre de la Méditerranée), often serving as a flagship. The ironclad played a minor role in the Franco-Prussian War of 1870–1871, blockading the North Sea coast of Prussia. Magananime was reduced to reserve after the war, but was reactivated in 1875 and assigned to the Mediterranean Fleet. The ship was decommissioned in 1878 and was stricken from the navy list in 1882. She was scrapped in 1885.

Design and description

The Provence class was designed as an enlarged version of the s with thicker armor, more powerful guns, and better seakeeping qualities. They displaced . Their crew numbered 579–594 officers and enlisted men.

When the French discovered that the British ironclad  had reached  during her sea trials, they decided to add an extra cylinder to the engine of the five ships still under construction in an attempt to achieve .

Armament and protection
The main battery of the Provence-class ships was intended to be thirty  Modèle 1858–60 rifled muzzle-loading (RML) guns, but this was changed to a mixed armament of four  Modèle 1864 RMLs and six  Modèle 1864 smoothbore muzzle-loading guns on the gundeck. Positioned on the quarterdeck and the forecastle were another 194 mm smoothbore and six 164.7 mm Modèle 1858 RMLs, at least some of which served as chase guns. By 1869–1870, Magnanimes armament consisted of eight 240 mm Modèle 1864 RMLs on the gundeck and four 194 mm Modèle 1864 smoothbores as chase guns on the quarterdeck and forecastle.

The conning tower's sides consisted of  armor plates.

Construction and service
Magnanime (Magnanimous) was ordered on 16 November 1860 from the Arsenal de Brest, laid down on 27 February 1861 and launched on 19 August 1864. She was commissioned for trials on 1 November 1865, and was definitively commissioned on 7 July 1866. Magananime was initially assigned to the Ironclad Division (Division cuirassée) of the Northern Squadron, based in Cherbourg, but then transferred to the Mediterranean Squadron. Together with Flandre and Magenta, Magnanime escorted the transports ferrying French troops home after the collapse of the Second French intervention in Mexico in 1867. By 1 April 1870, the ship was assigned to the Squadron of Evolutions (Escadre d'évolutions) and was the flagship of Vice Admiral Martin Fourichon.

When the Franco-Prussian War began on 19 July, the French had lost track of a squadron of four Prussian ironclads so the Mediterranean Squadron, including Magnanime, was deployed to Oran, French Algeria, to intercept them in case they attempted to interdict the troop convoys between French North Africa and Metropolitan France. When they received word that the Prussian ships had returned to Germany, the squadron sailed to Brest to prepare to blockade the coast of Prussia. Magnanmie remained Fourichon's flagship and his squadron was tasked to blockade German ports in the Heligoland Bight. It departed Brest on 8 August and arrived off the British-owned island of Heligoland three days later. The neutral British denied the French permission to re-coal there and the ships were forced to perform it at sea under dangerous conditions. Bad weather and a series of storms beginning in late August prevented the squadron from coaling and the ships were forced to return to France in early September. Vice Admiral Louis Henri de Gueydon relieved Fourichon on 6 September. By then the Prussians were besieging Paris and many of the trained gunners aboard the squadron's ships were transferred to defend the city. The squadron resumed the blockade with reduced crews until December when smaller ships took it over.

Magananime spent 1872–1875 in reserve at Toulon. By 21 October 1876 she was the flagship of Rear Admiral Ernest de Jonquières, commander of the Squadron of Evolutions of the Mediterranean Fleet. He had been relieved by Rear Admiral Pierre Foullioy by 27 October 1877. The ship was paid off the following year and condemned in 1879. Magananime was stricken from the navy list on 19 June 1882 and was broken up in 1885.

Citations

Bibliography

Further reading

1864 ships
Provence-class ironclads
Ships built in France